Raíces is a studio album by Julio Iglesias, released in 1989. It is an album in medley style of a collection of classic love songs from different countries. Raíces was nominated for a Lo Nuestro Award for Pop Album of the Year.

Track listing
"Latino: Intro Latino / Tres Palabras / Perfidia / Amapola / Noche De Ronda / Quizas, Quizas, Quizas / Adios/El Manisero" - 7:15
"Caballo Viejo/Bamboleo: Caballo Viejo / Bamboleo / Solo 1" - 4:41
"Mexico: Media Vuelta / Se Me Olvido Otra Vez / Y... / Mexico Lindo / Ay Jalisco No Te Rajes / La Bamba / Solo 2" - 9:17
"Brasil: Intro Brasil / Desafinado / Mas Que Nada / Manha De Carnaval / Aquarela Do Brasil / Tristeza / Maria Ninguem / Samba De Orfeu" - 7:11
"Italia: Intro Italia / Torna a Surriento / Quando M'Innamoro / T'Ho Voluto Bene (Non Dimenticar) / O Sole Mio! / Quando Quando Quando" - 6:18
"Francia: Intro Francia / Ne Me Quitte Pas / Que C'est Triste Venise / Et Maintenant / La Vie En Rose" - 5:23

Charts

Weekly charts

Year-end charts

Certifications

See also
List of number-one Billboard Latin Pop Albums from the 1980s
List of best-selling albums in Spain

References

1989 albums
Julio Iglesias albums
Sony Discos albums